Hwang Mun-seob (Hangul: 황문섭, born April 30, 1990), better known by his stage name Louie (Hangul: 루이), is a South Korean rapper and members of Geeks. He released his first album, Inspiration, on March 27, 2014.

Personal life
Louie married singer U Sung-eun on July 11, 2021.

Discography

Studio albums

Extended plays

Singles

Filmography

Variety show

References

1990 births
Living people
South Korean male rappers
South Korean hip hop singers
21st-century South Korean male  singers